Nikola Krestić (Serbian Cyrillic: Никола Крестић; 1824–1887) was a Croatian Serb nobleman, politician and lawyer. In 1873 Ban of Croatia Ivan Mažuranić named him as the president of the Croatian Sabor. He served as president for 11 years. He was also a recipient of the Austrian Imperial Order of Leopold. Krestić studied Philosophy in Budapest and Law in Zagreb. He worked as a secretary for the Ban of Croatia Josip Jelačić for two years. He edited parliamentary Saborske novine and participated in foundation and worked as an edited of the Slavenski jug. Krestić never married and his home in Opatička Street 16 in Zagreb was a popular spot in the social and political life of Zagreb at the time. His personal library counted 4620 titles.

References 

19th-century Austrian people
19th-century Croatian people
People from the Kingdom of Croatia-Slavonia
Representatives in the Croatian Parliament (1848–1918)
Serbs of Croatia
1824 births
1867 deaths